The 1989 Austrian motorcycle Grand Prix was the seventh round of the 1989 Grand Prix motorcycle racing season. It took place on the weekend of 2–4 June 1989 at the Salzburgring.

500 cc race report
Another pole for Kevin Schwantz, with Eddie Lawson and Wayne Rainey on his left as the light turns green. Lawson leads a large group through the first lap, with Rainey, Schwantz and about 4 other riders. Soon it’s a trio of the leading riders, until Schwantz begins to desperately open a gap, his bike squirming and bucking into the corners. A red mist seems to descend on Rainey, as he passes Lawson on the outside to briefly move into second, while Ron Haslam leads a fight for fourth that includes Christian Sarron, Pierfrancesco Chili, Kevin Magee and Mick Doohan, the last going off track trying to come to terms with the pace.

Schwantz enlarges his gap, while Lawson drops Rainey, which turns out to be the podium order. Rainey’s 13 point lead over Lawson is down to 11.

500cc classification

References

Austrian motorcycle Grand Prix
Austrian
Motorcycle Grand Prix